UPH may refer to:

 Unpenthexium, an unsynthesized chemical element with atomic number 156 and symbol Uph
 Uridine phosphorylase, an enzyme
 University of Perpetual Help System DALTA, a private university system
 Pelita Harapan University (Universitas Pelita Harapan), a private Christian university in Indonesia
 Upper Halliford railway station, Surrey, National Rail station code UPH